Epipremnum moszkowskii is a species of flowering plant of the genus Epipremnum, belonging to the family Araceae, it is a woody vine endemic to the tropical rainforest in the western part of the island of New Guinea (West New Guinea).

Distribution
This species is only distributed in the western part of the island of New Guinea, including the provinces of Papua and West Papua in Indonesia, where it is endemic.

References

moszkowskii